Basay was a Formosan language spoken around modern-day Taipei in northern Taiwan by the Basay, Qauqaut, and Trobiawan peoples. Trobiawan, Linaw, and Qauqaut were other dialects (see East Formosan languages).

Basay data is mostly available from Erin Asai's 1936 field notes, which were collected from an elderly Basay speaker in Shinshe, Taipei, as well as another one in Yilan who spoken the Trobiawan dialect (Li 1999). However, the Shinshe informant's speech was heavily influenced by Taiwanese, and the Trobiawan informant, named Ipai, had heavy Kavalan influence in her speech.

Li (1992) mentions four Basaic languages: Basay, Luilang, Nankan, Puting. Nankan and Puting are close to Kavalan, whereas Luilang is divergent.

Syntax
There are four optional case markers in Basay (Li 1999:646).
a – nominative, ligature (Shinshe dialect)
ta – nominative (Trobiawan dialect)
li – locative (Shinshe dialect)
u – oblique (Trobiawan dialect)

Some function words include (Li 1999):
pai 'future'

Trobiawan negators include (Li 1999):
mia 'not' (Shinshe dialect: mayu 'not (yet)')
asi 'don't' (Shinshe dialect: manai 'don't')
(m)upa 'not to want'
(Shinshe dialect: kualau 'not exist')

Yes-no questions are marked by u ~ nu (Li 1999:657).

Morphology
Basay verbs, like Kavalan verbs, distinguish between agent-focus (AF) and patient-focus (PF) verbs (Li 1999:650). The perfective prefixes na- and ni- are allomorphs.

Pronouns
The Basay pronouns below are from Li (1999:639).

References

Notes

General references

Further reading

External links

ABVD: Basai/Laurent Sagart
ABVD: Basay/Paul Jen-kuei Li (李壬癸)

Extinct languages of Asia
Languages of Taiwan
Formosan languages
Languages extinct in the 20th century